Cordia salicifolia, also called Cordia ecalyculata and chá de bugre, is a species of evergreen flowering tree in the borage family, Boraginaceae, that occurs mainly in Brazil and is used as a medicinal plant. Its red fruit, which resembles a coffee bean and contains caffeine, is roasted and brewed as a coffee substitute.

The leaves and fruit contain compounds such as caffeine, allantoin, allantoic acid, β-sitosterol, and spathulenol, as well as a significant amount of the electrolyte potassium. The plant has been used as a diuretic, as an appetite suppressant, and to promote skin healing. It shows activity against herpes simplex virus type 1 (HSV-1) in vitro. It has also shown some usefulness as a snakebite antivenom.

Features

The tree has an elongated crown. Its leaves are simple, completely devoid of pubescence, and 8–14 centimeters long. Small, fragrant white flowers with a campanulate calyx precede fruits that are globose, drupaceous berries, red in color, and similar to the fruit of the coffee tree.

Birds that feed on the fruits of Cordia salicifolia include guans, trogons, pigeons, tanagers, and aracaris.

Names

Dried leaves of the tree are sold widely under the Portuguese name "chá de bugre" ("tea of the savage"; "bugre" derives from "Bulgarian"). In Brazil and many publications, the tree is botanically classified as Cordia salicifolia, while in Paraguay it is classified as Cordia ecalyculata. Brazilians also call it "café do mato" ("coffee of the woods") for its similar red fruit containing caffeine and its popularity as a coffee substitute. Other names in use include Cordia digynia, Cordia coffeoides, claraiba, porangaba (Tupi porã'gaba, "beauty"), bugrinho, café de bugre, chá de frade, bois d'ine, café de la forêt, café des bois, cafezinho, cafezinho do mato, cha de negro mina, coquelicot, grao do porco, laranjeira do mato, louro salgueiro, louro mole, rabugem, and coffee of the woods.

Cordia salicifolia should not be confused with two other plants that have been called chá de bugre, Hedyosmum brasiliense and Pimenta pseudocaryophyllus.

Distribution and habitat

Cordia salicifolia is indigenous to Brazil, growing predominantly in tropical semi-deciduous forests in the states of Minas Gerais, Bahia, Acre, and Goias. It is also found in the tropical forests of Argentina and Paraguay.

References

salicifolia